Chris Walder (8 May 1900 – 6 December 1997) was a Dutch footballer. He played in one match for the Netherlands national football team in 1921.

References

External links
 

1900 births
1997 deaths
Dutch footballers
Netherlands international footballers
Place of birth missing
Association footballers not categorized by position